Iodosobenzene or iodosylbenzene is an organoiodine compound with the empirical formula . This colourless solid compound is used as an oxo transfer reagent in research laboratories examining organic and coordination chemistry.

Preparation and structure
Iodosobenzene is prepared from iodobenzene. It is prepared by first oxidizing iodobenzene by peracetic acid.  Hydrolysis of resulting diacetate affords "PhIO":

The structure of iodosobenzene has been verified by crystallographically. Related derivatives are also oligomeric. Its low solubility in most solvents and vibrational spectroscopy indicate that it is not molecular, but is polymeric, consisting of –I–O–I–O– chains. The related diacetate, illustrates the ability of iodine(III) to adopt a T-shaped geometry without multiple bonds. 
Theoretical studies show that the bonding between the iodine and oxygen atoms in iodosobenzene represents a single dative I-O sigma bond, confirming the absence of the double I=O bond.

A monomeric derivative iodosylbenzene is known in the form of 2-(tert-butylsulfonyl)iodosylbenzene, a yellow solid.  C-I-O angle is 94.78°, C-I and I-O distances are 2.128 and 1.848 Å.

Applications
Iodosobenzene has no commercial uses, but in the laboratory it is employed as an "oxo-transfer reagent." It epoxidizes certain alkenes and converts some metal complexes into the corresponding oxo derivatives. Although it is an oxidant, it is also mildly nucleophilic. These oxo-transfer reactions operate by the intermediacy of adducts PhI=O→M, which release PhI.

A mixture of iodosobenzene and sodium azide in acetic acid converts alkenes to vicinal diazides:.

Safety
This compound is explosive and should not be heated under vacuum.

See also 
Dess-Martin reagent

References

Iodanes
Phenyl compounds
Inorganic polymers
Reagents for organic chemistry